Mount Exley is a mountain at  in the Wallabies Nunataks, west of the Churchill Mountains of Antarctica. It was named in honor of R. R. Exley, a member of the 1962 Cape Hallett winter-over team, working as a technician on the geomagnetic project.

References 

Mountains of Oates Land